Thomas Stewart Bosworth (born 17 January 1990) is a British two-time Olympic race walker who holds three World bests, including the World Best for the 1Mile race walk, 5:31.08.

He also holds six British records, won 13 British Championships gold medals, a silver Commonwealth Games medal and is a World European Olympic Games finalist. Bosworth is currently ranked 1st overall in the UK for 20 km.  He was also selected to carry the Olympic Torch through Potternewton, Leeds.

Career
Bosworth currently trains full-time at the UK Race Walking centre in Leeds, at Leeds Met University.

He holds British records for walking 3 km, 5 km, 10 km and 20 km, with his Personal Best for 20 km at 1:19:38.

He first set the 20 km British record in Dudince, Slovakia in March 2016 to beat a 20 km race walk mark set by Ian McCombie in 1988, clocking 80:41 and taking 81 seconds off McCombie’s record.

He is also the British Record Holder for the 10 km race walk, set in 2015, along with the 5000m race walk, set in Birmingham at the 2018 British indoor team trials to qualify for the World Indoor Championships.

Along with the World Record for the 1Mile race walk won at London Diamond League, 2017, Bosworth is World Record holder for the 3000m indoor race walk at IAAF Indoor Grand Prix Glasgow, 2018, and the 3000m outdoor race walk at the Muller Anniversary Games, London, 2018.

He has won six British Outdoor Championships in 2011, 2014, 2015, 2016, 2017 and 2018, along with six British Indoor Championships, his first in 2015 followed by 2016, 2017, 2018, 2019 and 2020.

Bosworth qualified for the 2020 Summer Olympics after coming second at the 2021 British Athletics Marathon and 20km Walk Trial.

Achievements

Medals

Records held

Personal bests

International competitions

Media and public speaking
Bosworth has made several media appearances, including his appearance on Sky TV’s show “Game Changers”, commentating for the BBC at the 2014 European Athletics Championships, and again for Eurosport at the 2015 World Athletics Championships.

Championing LGBT rights and mental health in sport alongside his athletic career, Bosworth has spoken openly about both.

Bosworth came out as gay on the BBC's Victoria Derbyshire show on 13 October 2015. In the interview he explained that his family, friends and fellow sports athletes had known that he was gay for a number of years, and the coming out was to a wider audience to answer lingering questions from fans and to be himself. In the interview he told the BBC that he had been in "a really happy relationship" for the last four-and-a-half years. He proposed to and was accepted by his now-fiancé, Harry Dineley on Copacabana Beach during the Rio Olympics.

In 2018, he said that he was ready to risk prison to defend LGBT rights in Qatar during the 2019 World Athletics Championships.

In publications by the BBC, SkySports and the Telegraph among many others, Bosworth speaks about his mental health and how he overcame a period of depression. Alongside media appearances, he now also regularly visits schools and universities, to talk about his experiences as a professional athlete, LGBT equality, the importance of mental health and how sport can be of great benefit.

He has also spoken to the Culture, Media and Sport parliamentary committee, met with the Chairman of the FA to discuss homophobia in football, written piece for the Times Sport Newspaper on “drugs in sport”, addressed National Governing Bodies on behalf of Sport England and spoken at Wembley for Stonewall F.C.

References

External links
 
 
 
 
 
 
 
 
  (2010)
 
 

1990 births
Living people
People from Sevenoaks
Sportspeople from Kent
British male racewalkers
English male racewalkers
Olympic male racewalkers
Olympic athletes of Great Britain
Athletes (track and field) at the 2016 Summer Olympics
Athletes (track and field) at the 2020 Summer Olympics
Commonwealth Games medallists in athletics
Commonwealth Games silver medallists for England
Athletes (track and field) at the 2010 Commonwealth Games
Athletes (track and field) at the 2018 Commonwealth Games
World Athletics Championships athletes for Great Britain
British Athletics Championships winners
English LGBT sportspeople
Gay sportsmen
LGBT track and field athletes
Medallists at the 2018 Commonwealth Games